Isla Verde Reef (Spanish: Arrecife de Isla Verde) is a reef that surrounds Isla Verde Key, located off the coast of Punta del Medio in Isla Verde, Carolina, in the Atlantic coast of Puerto Rico. The Isla Verde Reef, protected as the Isla Verde Reef Marine Reserve (Reserva Marina Arrecife de Isla Verde), forms part of a larger reef system that extends from Punta Maldonado in Piñones, Loíza to the San Juan Islet. This is one of the three designated marine reserves in Puerto Rico, the other two being the Desecheo Coastal Waters and Tres Palmas marine reserves off the western coast of Puerto Rico, and the only one that protects a coral reef ecosystem on an urban area. The reserve is home to endangered species such as manatees, sea turtles and federally protected coral species such as the elkhorn coral. The coral reef is also an ideal place for fish spawning which is important for the fishing industry of the region. The Isla Verde Reef is protected through community organizations such as Arrecifes Pro Ciudad, and public organisms such as Para la Naturaleza (Puerto Rico Conservation Trust), with support from academic institutions such as the University of Puerto Rico at Bayamón.

See also 
 List of reefs
 Protected areas of Puerto Rico

References

External links 
 Official website 
 Official website 

Coral reefs
Protected areas of Puerto Rico